The 1973 Soviet football championship was the 41st seasons of competitive football in the Soviet Union and the 35th among teams of sports societies and factories. Ararat Yerevan won the championship becoming the Soviet domestic champions for the first time.

Honours

Notes = Number in parentheses is the times that club has won that honour. * indicates new record for competition

Soviet Union football championship

Top League

First League

Second League (finals)

 [Nov 4-20, Sochi]

Top goalscorers

Top League
Oleg Blokhin (Dinamo Kiev) – 18 goals

First League
Anatoliy Shepel (Chernomorets Odessa) – 38 goals

References

External links
 1973 Soviet football championship. RSSSF